Sarah Jane's Alien Files is a BBC series based on The Sarah Jane Adventures. It features the characters Sarah Jane Smith, Luke Smith, Clyde Langer and Rani Chandra entering data on aliens they have encountered during their adventures into Mr Smith, Sarah Jane's extraterrestrial computer, to benefit humanity in the event that Sarah Jane is no longer capable of defending the Earth against alien threats.

Each episode is a clip show summarising the events of episodes in which the featured aliens appeared. The only new footage is the framing and narration, shot entirely on the series' standing attic set. Occasionally, brief clips from Doctor Who are included for context, such as in Episode 6 when the Judoon are compared to the Cheetah People of Survival in that each humanoid species looks superficially like a non-humanoid terrestrial mammal (rhinoceros and cheetah, respectively).  The series format was based upon the short "alien files" clips previously produced for the CBBC's The Sarah Jane Adventures website.

The series is similar to the Doctor Who spin-off Monster Files.

Episode list

References

External links

 

The Sarah Jane Adventures
2010s British science fiction television series
2010 British television series debuts
2010 British television series endings
BBC children's television shows
British science fiction television shows
Doctor Who spin-offs
English-language television shows
British television spin-offs